James J. Lillie (July 27, 1861 - November 9, 1890), nicknamed "Grasshopper", was a Major League Baseball outfielder. He played four seasons in the major leagues, from  until .

Sources

Major League Baseball outfielders
Buffalo Bisons (NL) players
Kansas City Cowboys (NL) players
Kansas City Cowboys (minor league) players
Fort Worth Panthers players
Baseball players from New Haven, Connecticut
1861 births
1890 deaths
19th-century baseball players